The ear canal (external acoustic meatus, external auditory meatus, EAM) is a pathway running from the outer ear to the middle ear.

Structure
The human ear canal is divided into two parts. The elastic cartilage part forms the outer third of the canal; its anterior and lower wall are cartilaginous, whereas its superior and back wall are fibrous. The cartilage is the continuation of the cartilage framework of pinna. The cartilaginous portion of the ear canal contains small hairs and specialized sweat glands, called apocrine glands, which produce cerumen (ear wax). The bony part forms the inner two thirds. The bony part is much shorter in children and is only a ring (annulus tympanicus) in the newborn. The layer of epithelium encompassing the bony portion of the ear canal is much thinner and therefore, more sensitive in comparison to the cartilaginous portion.

Size and shape of the canal vary among individuals. It has a sigmoid form and runs from behind and above downward and forward. On the cross-section, it is of oval shape. These are important factors to consider when fitting earplugs.

Disorders
Due to its relative exposure to the outside world, the ear canal is susceptible to diseases and other disorders. Some disorders include:
 Atresia of the ear canal
Cerumen impaction
 Bone exposure, caused by the wearing away of skin in the canal
Auditory canal osteoma (bony outgrowths of the temporal bone)
Cholesteatoma
 Contact dermatitis of the ear canal
 Fungal infection (otomycosis)
Ear mites in animals
 Ear myiasis, an extremely rare infestation of maggots
Foreign body in ear
Granuloma, a scar usually caused by tympanostomy tubes
 Otitis externa (swimmer's ear), bacteria-caused inflammation of the ear canal
Stenosis, a gradual closing of the canal

Earwax

Earwax, also known as cerumen, is a yellowish, waxy substance secreted in the ear canals. It plays an important role in the human ear canal, assisting in cleaning and lubrication, and also provides some protection from bacteria, fungi, and insects. Excess or impacted cerumen can press against the eardrum and/or occlude the external auditory canal and impair hearing, causing conductive hearing loss. If left untreated, cerumen impaction can also increase the risk of developing an infection within the ear canal.

Additional images

See also 
 List of specialized glands within the human integumentary system

References

External links 
Veterans Health Administration web site
OSHA web site
Continuing Medical Education Ear Photographs
Otoscopy Tutorial w/ Images
 

Auditory system
Ear
Otology
Audiology